(literally, plank-floored bridge) is a bridge that spans the Shakujii River in Nakajuku, Itabashi-ku, Tokyo. The original bridge in this location, made of wood,  is said to be the origin of the name of Itabashi Ward. The current bridge is a ferroconcrete structure.

Overview
The existing bridge spans the intersection of the old Nakasendō and the Shakujii River. The bridge over the nearby Japan National Route 17 is called Shin-Itabashi.
There is a row of cherry blossom trees along the river near the bridge.

External links
 Itabashi Ward website
 Zatsuneta website

Bridges in Tokyo